is a former Japanese football player and manager.

Playing career
Matsunaga was born in Fujieda on February 8, 1963. After graduating from Osaka University of Commerce, he played for Matsushita Electric from 1984 to 1991. The club won the champions in 1990 Emperor's Cup which is first major title in the club history.

Coaching career
When Matsunaga was player for Matsushita Electric (later Gamba Osaka), he became a coach at the club in 1989. He coached for the club until 1994. In 1997, he signed with Verdy Kawasaki and in 1999 he became a manager. From 2003, he managed Ventforet Kofu (2003-2004), Vissel Kobe (2005), Sagawa Printing (2006) and FC Gifu (2007-2009).

Managerial statistics

References

External links

1963 births
Living people
Osaka University of Commerce alumni
Association football people from Shizuoka Prefecture
Japanese footballers
Japan Soccer League players
Gamba Osaka players
Japanese football managers
J1 League managers
J2 League managers
Tokyo Verdy managers
Ventforet Kofu managers
Vissel Kobe managers
FC Gifu managers
Yokohama F. Marinos managers
Association football defenders
People from Fujieda, Shizuoka